History Park at Kelley Park in San Jose, California, USA is designed as an indoor/outdoor museum, arranged to appear as a small US town might have in the early 1900s (decade). Since its inauguration in 1971, 32 historic buildings and other landmarks have either been moved from their original San Jose locations or are represented by replicas.

History San José
History Park at Kelley Park is operated by History San José, which also has its headquarters at History Park. History San José (HSJ) is the 501(c)(3) nonprofit organization that was formed from the San José Historical Museum.

HSJ traces its origins back to 1945, when local volunteer Clyde Arbuckle was appointed to the honorary position of San José City Historian; Arbuckle had no formal training, but was well-known for his keen interest in local history. In 1949, a temporary replica of the first State House was built in San Jose Civic Plaza to celebrate the centennial of the first Legislature of California. Arbuckle curated a well-received exhibit of local history shown with the State House replica. The replica was moved to the Santa Clara County Fairgrounds in 1950 and became the State House Museum, where Arbuckle served as the first curator, collecting local historic artifacts. So much material was donated that an annex, built in 1958 to house additional items, was full by 1962.

The Historical Museum of San José, managed by the city of San Jose, was founded in 1949 simultaneously with the State House centennial activities. In 1965, Theron Fox persuaded the city of San Jose to set aside  at the south end of Kelley Park to house the San José Historical Museum, intended to be a historical reconstruction of a small town, which opened on June 18, 1971. The San Jose Historical Museum Association was also founded in 1971 to administer Historical Museum activities. The architectural firm of Churchill & Zlatunich were retained to develop a master plan for the site by July 1, 1972. By February 1972, the museum was averaging over 1,000 visitors per month; admission prices were modest, at a maximum of $0.25 per adult ($1 for an annual pass).

On February 24, 1977, the half-scale replica of the Electric Light Tower was placed upright, and later that year, on September 25, the first major buildings were dedicated on the site, including the replica Pacific Hotel and historic Umbarger House. By 1980, the Historical Museum had brought onsite the Associated Oil Company Gas Station, Chiechi House, Coyote Post Office, Dashaway Stables, Doctor's Office, Empire Fire House, Print Shop, and Steven's Ranch Fruit Barn, although not all of them were open to the public; admission prices had risen modestly to $0.50 per adult.

The San José Historical Museum was spun off as the History San José nonprofit in 1998. HSJ manages History Park at Kelley Park from the upper floor of the Pacific Hotel in History Park, a replica of a historic hotel originally in downtown San Jose. HSJ is also responsible for the operation of the Peralta Adobe—Fallon House Historic Site and the Collection Center/Research Library & Archives, which are in downtown San Jose and Kelley Park, respectively.

Exhibits
Period exhibits consist mainly of the 32 historical buildings and replica buildings, including a doctor's office, a dentist's office (complete with an old foot-pedal-powered drill), blacksmith shed, a working print shop, the Pacific Hotel, the Empire Fire House, the Bank of Italy, a post office, and a number of houses of early Santa Clara Valley settlers. Some buildings house special interest historical societies and others host galleries. Admission is free, unless there is a special event being held.

On weekdays, tours are offered by paid staff, often for local students on class field trips. On weekends, selected exhibit buildings are staffed on a rotating schedule by volunteers, who also operate a vintage trolley over the length of the park, including under the Light Tower replica.

Buildings

Other structures
 A half scale replica of the San Jose Electric Light Tower that used to tower  over downtown San Jose at Santa Clara and Market.
 A bandstand

Exhibits

Other attractions include:

 The Leonard and David McKay Gallery, opened on March 13, 2005, displays a collection of paintings of people, buildings, and landscapes from in and around the Santa Clara Valley.
 The Perham Collection of Early Electronics, previously at Foothills Electronics Museum. The Collection is housed at History San Jose's Collection Center and is not currently on display.
 Steam locomotive Southern Pacific 1215 and tender, Orchard Supply Hardware boxcar, and Missouri Pacific caboose, in a static display.

Map

References

External links

History San Jose Website – Official site
Map of History Park
Chinese Historical & Cultural Project
California Trolley & Railroad Corporation
California Pioneers of Santa Clara Valley
Portraits of the Past (historical fashion shows)
List of vehicles in the Trolley Barn (click on the "antique vehicles" link near the bottom of the page)

History of San Jose, California
Parks in San Jose, California
Open-air museums in California
History museums in California
Museums in San Jose, California
Museums established in 1971
1971 establishments in California